Jāliyat al-Kadr is a supplicatory poem in which God is implored through the Islamic prophet Muhammad and his companions who fought alongside him in the Battles of Badr and Uhud. It was written by Ja’far b. Ḥasan b. ‘Abd al-Karīm b. al-Sayyid Muḥammad b. ‘Abd al-Rasūl al-Barzanjī, the Shafite Mufti of Medina and author of the Mawlid al-Barzanjī. The Jāliyat al-Kadr was written in the 18th century when the Ottoman empire was in decline and the Muslim world was in a state of political and intellectual upheaval. It is an example of a Sunni devotional work on intercession.

Structure
The Jāliyat al-Kadr has four sections:
Muqaddimah (Opening)
Asmā’ Ahl al-Badr (Names of the People of Badr)
Asmaā’ Shuhadā’ Uhud (Names of the Martyrs of Uhud)
Khatimah (Closing)

Commentary
A known commentary of Jāliyat al-Kadr is al-ʿArā’is al-Wāḍiḥa al-Gharar fī Sharḥ al-Manẓūma al-Badriyya by ‘Abdul Hādi Najā al-Abyārī (d. 1888).

Annotation
Al-Sayyid Muhammad Alawi al-Maliki (d. 2004) annotated and released an edition of the Jāliyat al-Kadr in the 80s.

Translation
In 2015, Manaqib Press published the first English translation of Jāliyat al-Kadr. It was translated by Abdul Aziz Ahmed and redacted by Amjad Mahmood.

Popular Devotion
Traditionally, Jāliyat al-Kadr is recited on the 17th of Ramadan, at the completion of the Qur'an and at general gatherings of remembrance. In Dar al-Mustafa, it is recited at `Aṣr on the 17th of Ramadan.

See also
Al-Barzanjī
Mawlid al-Barzanjī

References

External links
شرح عبد الهادى نجا الأبيارى المسمى بالعرائس الواضحةالغرر فى شرح المنظومة البدرية المسماة جالية الكدر فى فضل أهل بدر واحد (Arabic commentary of Jāliyat al-Kadr)
جالية الكدر (Android App with Arabic text of Jāliyat al-Kadr)
جالية الكدر باسماء اهل بدر (Audio of Jāliyat al-Kadr)
Removal of Distress (English translation of Jāliyat al-Kadr)

18th-century books
Islamic poetry
Sufism